The Loyalty Medal was a single-grade decoration awarded by South Vietnam. Established in 1964, the medal was awarded to South Vietnamese citizens by the Chief of the Joint General Staff, Republic of Vietnam Military Forces. The medal could be awarded posthumously.

Criteria
The Loyalty Medal was awarded to Vietnamese citizens who had shown proven loyalty to the "National Cause" by denouncing or working to counter, what were deemed by the South Vietnamese government to be, subversive activities that were disruptive to security and order.

See also 
Orders, decorations, and medals of South Vietnam

References

Military awards and decorations of Vietnam